The 1989 Ball State Cardinals football team was an American football team that represented Ball State University in the Mid-American Conference (MAC) during the 1989 NCAA Division I-A football season. In its fifth season under head coach Paul Schudel, the team compiled a 7–3–2 record (6–1–1 against conference opponents) and won the MAC championship. The team played its home games at Ball State Stadium in Muncie, Indiana.

The team's statistical leaders included David Riley with 1,929 passing yards, Bernie Parmalee with 662 rushing yards, Sean Jones with 518 receiving yards, and Kenny Stucker with 84 points scored.

Schedule

References

Ball State
Ball State Cardinals football seasons
Mid-American Conference football champion seasons
Ball State Cardinals football